Bolotin (from болотo meaning swamp) is a Russian masculine surname, its feminine counterpart is Bolotina. 

It is generally a toponym - from the Bolotnya Болотня township in the Mogilev province of eastern Belarus.

It may refer to:

Craig Bolotin (born 1954), American screenwriter and film director.
Elena Bolotina (born 1997), Belarusian rhythmic gymnast.
Jacob Bolotin (1888–1924), American physician.
Maxim Bolotin (born 1982), Russian ice dancer.
Michael Bolton (born Michael Bolotin in 1953), American singer and songwriter.
Ron Bolotin, Israeli paralympic swimmer.
Sergey Vladimirovich Bolotin (born 1954), Russian mathematician
Vladimir V. Bolotin (1926–2008), Russian physicist.

References

Russian-language surnames